Malaya Zemlya (lit. "Small Land") was a Soviet uphill outpost on Cape Myskhako that was recaptured after battles with the Germans during the Battle of the Caucasus, on the night of 4 February 1943. The episode paved way for a Soviet attack on German forces in Novorossiysk.

Cape Myskhako is associated with a stand made by the 800-strong contingent of the Soviet Naval Infantry against the Germans during the Second World War. The special forces were dropped during winter high storms by the Soviet Black Sea Fleet, after the unsuccessful landing attempt at Malajia Ozereevka.  The landing at Malaya Zemlya had aimed to be a decoy, but after the landing at Bolshaia Ozereevka was lost in an ambush, the offensive plan was reworked and the landing site at Malaya Zemlya was made the main landing location.  Upon landing to secure the beachhead, they came under a German counter-offensive with air support.

The marines held their ground. The leader of the group, the Soviet Major Caesar Kunikov was mortally wounded, and was posthumously awarded the highest Soviet honor Hero of the Soviet Union.

The battle was the subject of the first book of Brezhnev's trilogy, which exaggerated Leonid Brezhnev's role in the Eastern Front.

External link
Malaya Zemlya Memorial

Novorossiysk
Battles and operations of the Eastern Front of World War II
History of Kuban
Leonid Brezhnev